Tharindu Gamage (born 30 May 1996) is a Sri Lankan cricketer. He made his Twenty20 debut for Nugegoda Sports and Welfare Club in the 2019–20 SLC Twenty20 Tournament on 14 January 2020. He made his List A debut on 3 April 2021, for Kandy Customs Cricket Club in the 2020–21 Major Clubs Limited Over Tournament.

References

External links
 

1996 births
Living people
Sri Lankan cricketers
Kandy Customs Sports Club cricketers
Nugegoda Sports and Welfare Club cricketers 
Place of birth missing (living people)